Disappearance of 'The Eagle', is a 1940 Soviet adventure film directed by Vasily Zhuravlyov.

Plot 
The film takes place in 1920 during the civil war, the Soviet army fights on the outskirts of Novorossiysk. At the berths of the port is one of the most powerful domestic ships - the Eagle. The boatswain of the ship Mikhail Gruzdev was able to persuade Captain Chistyakov to put a red flag on the ship, the settlement of which the ship left Novorossiysk, and Gruzdev went in search of him.

Starring 
 Nikolai Annenkov as Fyodor Platonovich Chistyakov
 Viktor Gromov as Mikhail Terentevich Gruzdev
 Sergey Stolyarov as Fyodor Fyodorovich Chistyakov
 Mikhail Troyanovskiy as Ilya Mitrofanovich Svetlov
 Sergey Komarov
 Lev Fenin
 Andrey Fayt
 Pyotr Sobolevsky as Vasiliy Ivanovich Pylnov
 Nikolay Gorlov as Ivan Petrovich
 Ivan Bobrov as Zhukov

References

External links 
 

1940 films
1940s Russian-language films
Soviet black-and-white films
Soviet adventure thriller films
1940s adventure thriller films
Russian Civil War films